Stephenville is an unincorporated community located in Sunflower County, Mississippi, United States.

References 

Unincorporated communities in Sunflower County, Mississippi
Unincorporated communities in Mississippi